Stone Quarry Hill is a mountain in the Central New York region of New York. It is located northwest of East Worcester.

References

Mountains of Otsego County, New York
Mountains of New York (state)